Kamen Rider Ex-Aid is a Japanese tokusatsu drama in the Kamen Rider series. It is the 18th installment of the franchise in the Heisei era, and the 27th overall. The series tells the story of a group of doctors who become Kamen Riders and use their power to fight the Bugsters, monsters created from a digital infection that originated from the video games that threaten the entire human race. It premiered on TV Asahi on October 2, 2016 with the last episode airing on August 27, 2017.

Like in most Japanese video game covers, each episode's title is written part in English, part in kanji. All of the episodes were written by Yuya Takahashi.

Episodes



References

External links

Ex-Aid
Kamen Rider Ex-Aid